This is a partial chronological list of cases decided by the United States Supreme Court during the Fuller Court, the tenure of Chief Justice Melville Weston Fuller from October 8, 1888, through July 4, 1910.

References

External links

Fuller
List